Edward Scott Lloyd (born August 22, 1979) is an American lawyer who served as the director of the Office of Refugee Resettlement and as a senior advisor in the Center for Faith and Opportunity Initiatives.

Education 
Lloyd received his undergraduate education at James Madison University and earned his J.D. from the Columbus School of Law. He is licensed in Virginia.

Career 
Lloyd was an elementary English and social studies teacher before attending law school. He worked in private practice, at the Department of Health and Human Services (IOS/OGC), and on Capitol Hill (Government Reform Subcommittee on Criminal Justice, Drug Policy, and Human Resources). Lloyd worked for the Knights of Columbus where he served as an attorney in the public policy office. In that capacity, he helped shape the organization's humanitarian response and led its policy advocacy on behalf of the ethnic and religious minorities who are victims of ISIS.

In March 2017, Lloyd became the Director of the Office of Refugee Resettlement (ORR). Media reports have said that Lloyd was "effectively" removed from running the ORR in mid-July 2018 amid controversy over his anti-abortion actions impacting pregnant minors. In response, Lloyd characterized such reports as "not true." He added, "you can FOIA any day's worth of work and find that I remained the decision-maker until November," and that he received an "outstanding rating -- five out of five" in a performance review.

In November 2018, he took a position in the Center for Faith and Opportunity Initiatives where he served as a senior advisor. In this role, he worked "on outreach to faith-based partners for DHHS." He departed DHHS on June 7, 2019.

In 2020, Lloyd ran for town council in Front Royal, Virginia. After being elected to town council and serving for fifteen months, he resigned in March of 2022, citing conflicts of interest.

Personal life 
Lloyd resides in Front Royal, Virginia with his wife and seven children.

Selected works

References 

1979 births
21st-century American lawyers
American anti-abortion activists
Columbus School of Law alumni
James Madison University alumni
Living people
Trump administration personnel
United States Department of Health and Human Services officials
Virginia lawyers
Catholics from Virginia